The fixture between Nottingham Forest and Leicester City is a football rivalry played between the two East Midlands clubs, often referred to as an East Midlands derby. There have been a total of 108 meetings dating back to 1901.

Though Forest are closer in proximity to both Notts County and Derby County, and Leicester's nearest club is Coventry City, the clubs are the two most successful clubs in the East Midlands, and represent its two largest cities.

Notable games

One match which remains Leicester City's worst defeat and Nottingham Forest's record league win is the 12–0 result at the City Ground on 21 April 1909, when Leicester were known as Leicester Fosse. The performance by Fosse players was so appalling that The Football League ordered an enquiry, although no further action was taken after it turned out several of the already relegated Leicester side were hungover from a player's wedding the night before.

On 18 September 2007, Nottingham Forest were given a 'free goal' by Leicester City in a League Cup match at the City Ground. It was a rescheduled match after their original meeting on 28 August, which Forest were leading 1–0, was abandoned due to Leicester player Clive Clarke collapsing in the dressing room at half-time. Leicester nonetheless won the match 3–2.

To date, there have been nine hat-tricks recorded in fixtures between the two clubs, of which seven are from Nottingham Forest. Of the seven, three of those hat-tricks came from the 12–0 mauling of Leicester Fosse in 1909. Forest's most recent hat-trick against Leicester was from Robert Earnshaw in December 2009. In November 1948, Don Revie became the first Leicester player to score a hat-trick against Forest, a feat matched by Jermaine Beckford in a 4–0 FA Cup win on 17 January 2012. 

A notable game between the sides in recent history happened on 4 May 2013, the final day of the 2012–13 Football League Championship season, with both sides having a chance of making the promotion play-offs with a win. Forest took an early lead through Simon Cox, but the score was 2–2 at half time, a scoreline that remained until late into injury time when Anthony Knockaert gave Leicester a first league win at the City Ground since 1972, sending Leicester into the play-offs.

On 3 October 2022, Leicester and Forest met for the first time in the top-flight of English football for 23 years, with the sides 20th and 19th respectively. Leicester won the game 4–0.

Honours, head to head, and statistics

Honours

Head-to-head 

The below table demonstrates the competitive results between the two sides (not indicative of titles won).

Crossing the divide

Players

The list below shows transfer dates and fees, where known.

Leicester City then Nottingham Forest
Andy Impey – May 2004, free transfer
Yohan Benalouane – January 2019, undisclosed fee
Ben Hamer – July 2015, loan

The following played for one or more teams before moving to Nottingham Forest:
Matt Mills – Played for Bolton Wanderers in between
Matty Fryatt – Played for Hull City and Sheffield Wednesday in between
Lee Peltier – Played for Forest on loan from Leeds United
Jack Hobbs – Played for Hull City in between
Neil Lennon – Played for Celtic in between
John Curtis – Played for Portsmouth in between
Peter Shilton – Played for Stoke City in between
Molla Wagué – Played for Udinese and Watford before joining Forest on loan in 2019
Anthony Knockaert – Joined Forest on loan from Fulham in 2020
Jesse Lingard – Played for five different clubs in between a loan with Leicester City and a free transfer to Nottingham Forest

Nottingham Forest then Leicester City
Wes Morgan – January 2012, £1,000,000
Paul Konchesky – July 2011, undisclosed amount. Played for Forest on loan from Liverpool, then joined Leicester at the end of the loan spell
Gareth Williams – July 2004, £500,000
Riccardo Scimeca – June 2003, free transfer
Nicky Summerbee – August 2002, free transfer
Alan Rogers – November 2001, £300,000. Returned to Forest in 2004
Kjetil Osvold – April 1987, loan

The following played for one or more teams before moving to Leicester City:
Matthew Upson – Played for six different clubs in between
Andy Johnson – Played for West Bromwich Albion in between
Stan Collymore – Played for Liverpool and Aston Villa in between
Phil Gilchrist – Played for Middlesbrough, Hartlepool United, and Oxford United in between
Garry Parker – Played for Aston Villa in between, also had a spell as caretaker manager at Leicester

Managers
Rob Kelly – Played for and managed Leicester, later caretaker manager of Forest on three separate occasions
Billy Davies – Played briefly for Leicester, before going on to manage Nottingham Forest on two separate spells (also managed Derby County)
Gary Megson – Played for and managed Forest, later managed Leicester
Steve Beaglehole – Reserve team coach for Forest, briefly joint caretaker manager at Leicester
Micky Adams – Assistant and briefly caretaker manager at Forest, later managed Leicester
Dave Bassett – Managed Forest, and was later manager, Director of football, and caretaker manager at Leicester
Martin O'Neill – Played for Forest, managed Leicester, later managed Forest.
David Pleat – Played for Forest, later managed Leicester
Matt Gillies – Leicester City's longest serving manager, later went on to manage Forest

Game list

Hooliganism and crowd trouble 
In 1977, an incident described as "trouble" broke out after a match between Leicester and Forest. Eighteen people were arrested in connection with the incident.

Incidents of throwing of objects and racist chanting from Nottingham Forest fans towards Leicester fans have also been observed in recent years. Reports of racist chanting and items being thrown at Alan Rogers during a 2–2 draw between the clubs in 2002. Most recently during an FA Cup tie in January 2012, which resulted in eleven arrests.

Following a derby clash on 4 May 2013, six Forest fans were arrested after Leicester won the game and a play-off place in the 91st minute of play.

Prior to Leicester and Forest's 2–2 draw on 19 February 2014, a Nottingham Forest fan was arrested for tweeting racist abuse at Leicester fans.

A fight broke out between both sets of supporters during a boxing event at the King Power Stadium in September 2018. 

Two men were arrested after violent incidents before and after Nottingham Forest's fourth-round FA Cup tie with Leicester City in February 2002.  Officers were called to disturbances in Nottingham city centre before the game began.  During the FA Cup match a Leicester City fan was arrested and later charged with three counts of common assault and going onto a playing area at a football match. 

On 6 February 2022 before the 2021–22 FA Cup clash between the sides, Leicester fans vandalised a bar in the city centre of Nottingham prior to kick off and a Leicester City fan ran on the pitch as Nottingham Forest players were celebrating a goal and attacked one of the Forest players.

See also
East Midlands derby
M69 derby
Derby – Leicester rivalry

References

England football derbies
Nottingham Forest
Nottingham Forest F.C.
Football in Leicestershire
Football in Nottinghamshire
Nottingham Forest